David Theodore Creighton (June 24, 1930 – August 18, 2017) was a Canadian ice hockey forward. Creighton started his National Hockey League career with the Boston Bruins in 1948. He would also play with the Toronto Maple Leafs, Chicago Black Hawks, and New York Rangers. On August 18, 1955, the Detroit Red Wings traded Creighton and Bronco Horvath to the New York Rangers in exchange for Aggie Kukulowicz and Billy Dea. He left the NHL after the 1960 season. He played several more seasons in the AHL before retiring after the 1969 season. After this, he coached the Providence Reds from 1969 to 1970. His son Adam also played in the NHL.

Career statistics

References

External links

1930 births
2017 deaths
Baltimore Clippers players
Boston Bruins players
Buffalo Bisons (AHL) players
Canadian ice hockey centres
Chicago Blackhawks players
Hershey Bears players
Ice hockey people from Ontario
New York Rangers players
Providence Reds coaches
Providence Reds players
Rochester Americans players
Sportspeople from Thunder Bay
Toronto Maple Leafs players
Canadian ice hockey coaches